The Men's road race took place at 10 October 2010 at the Indira Gandhi Arena. The race started at 13:00 and covered 168 km.

Final classification
The notation "s.t." indicates that the rider crossed the finish line in the same group as the one receiving the time above him, and was therefore credited with the same finishing time.
130 riders were named but only 51 reached the finish line :

Did Not Finish

Danny Lloyd Laud
Kris Pradel
Ronnie Bryan
Benjamin Phillip
Claude Richardson
Justin Hodge

Rohan Dennis
Travis Meyer
Luke Durbridge
Michael Matthews

Ken Manassah Jackson
Jyme Bridges
Marvin Spencer
Omari King

Rowshan Jones
Laurence Jupp

Jairo Campos
Byron Pope
Brandon Cattouse

Chris Walker

Marlon Williams
Alanzo Greaves

 Sombir
Amandeep Singh
Rajesh Chandrasekar
Harpreet Singh

Graeme Hatcher
Chris Whorrall
Mark Christian
Tom Black

Marloe Rodman
Oneil Anthony Samuels

Richard Tanguy

Paul Agorir
Samwel Ekiru
John Njenga Kibunja
Hillary Kiprotich
Ismael Chelang'A Maiyo
Zakayo Mwai

Missi Kathumba
Leonard Tsoyo

Anuar Manan
Muhamad Adiq Husainie Othman
Yusrizal Usoff

Yolain Calypso
Jean Charles Pascal Ladaub
Louis Desire Hugo Caetane

Marc Ryan
Clinton Avery
Sam Bewley

Martyn Irvine

Adrien Niyonshuti
Nicodem Habiyambere
Gasore Hategeka

James Mcallum
David Lines
Ross Creber

Andy Rose
Francis Louis

Moses Sesay
Agustine Sesay

Darren Lill
Christoffer Van Heerden

Dane Nugara
Lakhshitha Sandakelum Wedikkaralage
Janaka Hermantha Kumara

Kurt Nahum Maraj

Hansel Andrews
Shimano Bailey
Dominic Ollivierrie

David Kigongo
David Magezi
Sebastian Kigongo
Achilles Katumba
Leon Matovu
George Kisenyi

Samuel Harrison
Jon Mould

External links
 Cycling - Road - Men's 168 Km Road Race - 10 Oct 2010 commonwealthgames.stats.com

Cycling at the 2010 Commonwealth Games
Road cycling at the Commonwealth Games
2010 in road cycling